The Boston Museum (1841–1903), also called the Boston Museum and Gallery of Fine Arts, was a theatre, wax museum, natural history museum, zoo, and art museum in 19th-century Boston, Massachusetts. Moses Kimball established the enterprise in 1841.

History
The Boston Museum exhibited items acquired from Ethan Allen Greenwood's former New England Museum; tableaux of wax figures; live animals; and artworks by John Singleton Copley, Gilbert Stuart, Benjamin West, Thomas Badger and others. Early live shows presented, for instance, "the musical olio, consisting of solos on glass bells, and birch-bark whistling." Theatrical performances began in 1843. Through the years, notable performers included: Lawrence Barrett, Edwin Booth, John Wilkes Booth, Madge Lessing, Richard Mansfield, E. H. Sothern, Mary Ann Vincent, and William Warren.

An advertisement of 1850 described the museum's key attractions:
"The museum is the largest, most valuable, and best arranged in the United States. It comprises no less than seven different museums, to which has been added the present year, besides the constant daily accumulation of articles, one half of the celebrated Peale's Philadelphia Museum, swelling the already immense collection to upwards of half a million articles, the greatest amount of objects of interest to be found together at any one place in America; and an entirely new hall of wax statuary.... and the immense collection of birds, beasts, fish, insects and reptiles;... paintings, engravings and statuary; ... Egyptian mummies, ... family of Peruvian mummies; the duck-billed platypus;... the curious half-fish, half-human Fejee Mermaid;... elephants and ourang-outangs..."

The Museum held a recruiting office for Company D. of the 22nd Massachusetts Volunteer Infantry in 1861 at the start of the Civil War.

Architecture
Hammatt Billings designed the original museum building, located at 18 Tremont Street; In 1846 Hammatt and J. E. Billings also designed the museum's next building, at 28 Tremont Street, located next door to the Massachusetts Historical Society, and close to the King's Chapel Burying Ground. The interior of the museum's 1846 building featured decoration by Ignaz Gaugengigl.[The building] is arranged in two main portions with an area between for light and air, one communicating with the other at either end by a wide passage. The building upon Tremont Street, the front of which is of Granite in a chaste and beautiful style of Venetian Architecture, with three spacious balconies running the entire length of the building, contains on the first story, five commodious stores, and the entrance to the Museum. Above this story, the whole front building to the eaves, three stories, is occupied as a grand Corinthian Hall... containing the collection. The galleries... are supported by twenty stately columns rising from the floor.... A spacious staircase and passage-way leads to the Exhibition Hall in the rear building... capable of accommodating nearly two thousand persons."

Images

Selected shows

 The Drunkard (1844)
 Aladdin (1846)
 Sweethearts (1847)
 The Forty Thieves and the Fairy of the Lake, by Michael Kelley (1849)
 King Richard III (1849)
 Children of Cyprus (1851)
 Nature's Nobleman (1851)
 The Seven Castles (1851)
 The Enchanted Harp (1852)
 The Silver Spoon, by Joseph Stevens Jones (1852)
 Uncle Tom's Cabin (1852)
 The Jewess (1853)
 The Talisman or, The Fairy's Favor (1853)
 Hard Times (1854)
 Make Your Wills, by Edward Mayhew and G. Smith (1854)
 Peter Wilkins Or—The Flying Islanders (1854)
 The Forty Thieves (1856)
 Neighbor Jackwood (1857)
 The Sea of Ice (1857)
 Bluebeard (1860)
 Buckstone's Married Life (1861)
 Dion Boucicault's The Octaroon (1861)
 My Lord and my Lady (1861)
 Tom Taylor's Babes in the Wood (1861)
 Uncle Robert (1861)
 Lady of Lyons, by Edward Bulwer-Lytton (1862)
 The Apostate (1863)
 Romeo and Juliet (1864)
 H.M.S. Pinafore (1878)
  Dr. Jekyll and Mr. Hyde (1887)
 Agatha, by Isaac Henderson (1892)
 The Shanghraun (1892)
 Hours with Dickens (1892)
 The Prodigal Father (1893)
 Tobasco (c. 1894)
 The Widow Jones (c. 1895)
 Mrs. Dane's Defense (1903)

Selected performers

 Mr. & Mrs. J. W. Wallack, Jr (1850)
 Horn, Wells, and Briggs' Ethiopian Serenaders (1851)
 Mad. Radinski (1851)
 Mr. C. D. Pitt. (1851)
 Mrs. Barrett (1851)
 Annetta Galletti (1852)
 Henry Sedley (1852)
 Julia Bennett (1852)
 Caroline Richings and Mr. Peter Richings (1853)
 Lysander Thompson (1853)
 Miss Eliza Logan (1853)
 Agnes Robertson (1854)
 Annette Ince (1854)
 Miss E. Raymond (1854)
 Louisa Howard and Mr. H. Farren (1855)
 Mr. Geo. Jamison (1855)
 Mrs. Annie Senter (1855)
 E. F. Keach (1856)
 James Bennett (1856)
 Mrs Farren (1856)
 Annie Senter (1857)
 Mr & Mrs E. L. Davenport (1857)
 Mr. J. W. Wallack, Jr. (1857)
 Mrs. W. C. Gladstane (1857)
 Mrs. D. P. Bowers (1857)
 Mr. L. P. Barrett (1858)
 Virginia Cunningham (1858)
 Cooper Opera Troupe (1860)
 H. C. Cooper. (1860)
 Kate Reignolds (1860)
 Miss Joey Gougenheim (1860)
 Charles Dillon (1861)
 Emma Waller (1861)
 Mr. C. W. Couldock (1861)
 Mr. Sothern (1861)
 Charlotte Thompson (1862)
 Edwin Adams (1862)
 Fox's Ravel Troupe (1862)
 Matilda Heron (1862)
 Miss Bateman (1862)
 John Wilkes Booth (1863)
 Mary Frances Scott-Siddons (1868)
 Walter Montgomery (1871)
 Evelyn Campbell (1889-90)

References

Further reading
Published in the 19th century
 Boston Museum. Boston Evening Transcript, Sept. 2, 1843.
 Rhyming catalogue of the rare, curious and valuable collection of curiosities, and works of art; in the Boston Museum. Boston Museum, 1848.
 Tom Pop's First Visit to the Boston Museum. Boston : Printed for the Publisher, 1848.
 Catalogue of the paintings, portraits, marble and plaster statuary, engravings and water color drawings: in the collection of the Boston Museum, together with a descriptive sketch of the institution, and general summary of the natural history specimens, curiosities, etc. Boston: Marden, 1849.
 Boston Museum. Boston Evening Transcript, May 29, 1850.
 Boston Sights and Strangers' Guide. 1856.
 King's Dictionary of Boston. 1883.
 The oldest theatre now in Boston. The Bostonian. Nov. 1894.
Published in the 20th century
 Clapp. "The great dramatic quinquennium and The Boston Museum." Reminiscences of a dramatic critic. Houghton, Mifflin and Company, 1902. Internet Archive
 Howard Ticknor. The Passing of the Boston Museum. The New England Magazine 26. June 1903.
 Claire McGlinchee. The first decade of the Boston Museum. Boston, B. Humphries, 1940.
 Mammen, Edward William, The Old Stock Company School of Acting; a Study of the Boston Museum. Boston, Mass. : Trustees of the Public Library, 1945.
 Weldon B. Durham, ed. American theatre companies 1749-1887. Greenwood, 1986.
 Bloomfield, Zachary Stewart. Baptism of a "Deacon's" theatre: audience development at the Boston Museum, 1841-1861 (dissertation). University of Missouri; 1991.
 Andrea Stulman Dennett. Weird and wonderful: the dime museum in America. New York University Press. 1997.
Published in the 21st century
 Peter DeMarco. A museum of the world, and the weird on Tremont St. Boston Globe, May 23, 2004. p. 6.

External links

 WorldCat. Boston Museum (1847-1903)
 Boston Athenaeum. Theatre history.
 Yale University Library. Last nights but two of the engagement of Mrs. Barrett.

Defunct museums in Boston
Former theatres in Boston
Infrastructure completed in 1846
Former buildings and structures in Boston
1841 establishments in Massachusetts
1903 disestablishments
Financial District, Boston
19th century in Boston
Museums established in 1841